Thomas Hansda is an Indian politician. He was elected to the Lok Sabha, lower house of the Parliament of India from Rajmahal, Bihar as a member of the Indian National Congress.

References

External links
Official biographical sketch in Parliament of India website

Living people
Indian National Congress politicians
Lok Sabha members from Bihar
India MPs 1996–1997
India MPs 1999–2004
Year of birth missing (living people)
Indian National Congress politicians from Bihar